NA-125 Lahore-IX is a newly-created constituency for the National Assembly of Pakistan. It mainly comprises the Raiwind Tehsil.

Members of Parliament

2018-2022: NA-136 Lahore-XIV

Election 2018 

General elections were held on 25 July 2018.

See also
NA-124 Lahore-VIII
NA-126 Lahore-X

References 

Lahore